Eumecia is a genus of skinks found in Sub-Saharan Africa.

Classification
There are two species:
Eumecia anchietae Bocage, 1870 - Anchieta's snake skink, western serpentiform skink, Lunda western snake skink 
Eumecia johnstoni (Boulenger, 1897)

References

 
Skinks of Africa
Lizard genera
Taxa named by José Vicente Barbosa du Bocage